Ingrid Louis (born 23 September 1977) is a former swimmer who competed for Mauritius in the 1996 Summer Olympic Games.

Career 

Louis began swimming in 1985 after the Indian Ocean Island Games. She competed in the women's 50 metre freestyle finishing 53rd out of 55 competitors with a time of 29.56 seconds. She retired in 2002 and became an insurance agent after working in shipping and marketing.

References

External links
 

1977 births
Living people
Olympic swimmers of Mauritius
Swimmers at the 1996 Summer Olympics
Mauritian female swimmers
Insurance agents